Chrysoesthia stipelloides is a moth of the family Gelechiidae. It is found in South Africa (KwaZulu-Natal) and Madagascar.

This species has a wingspan of 10-11mm and was formerly confused by Edward Meyrick with Chrysoesthia stipella (now considered as a junior-synonyme of Chrysoesthia sexguttella) from which it differs by genitalia and that has less developed yellow maculae.

Biology
The larvae were reared in Madagascar by R.Paulian  on Achyranthes aspera.

References

Moths described in 1950
Chrysoesthia